The Mandarin Square is a 39-storey residential skyscraper at the Binondo district in Manila, Philippines.

References

Skyscrapers in Manila
Buildings and structures in Binondo
Residential buildings completed in 2010
Residential skyscrapers in Metro Manila